Epithele is a genus of crust fungi in the family Polyporaceae.

Taxonomy
Epithele was first proposed in 1899 by French mycologist Narcisse Théophile Patouillard as a section of the genus Hypochnus. He included Hypochnus dussii and the type species, H. typhae, based on their similar appearance, habitat, and organization. Patouillard emphasized the presence of hyphal pegs as a major distinguishing characteristic of the genus. Hyphal pegs are bundles of hyphae that originate in the trama and project into the hymenium. A year later, he raised Epithele to generic status, maintaining the same two species. Hypochnus dussii later became the type of the genus Tubulicium. Daisy Boquiren revised the genus in 1971, accepting 13 species. Later contributions to the systematics of Epithele were made by Jülich (1976), Boidin and Lanquetin (1983), Boidin and Gilles (2000), and Hjortstam and Ryvarden (2005). In 2013, Karen Nakasone emended the generic concept to include Epithele bambusae (a species without hyphal pegs), and accepted 17 species.

Species
, Index Fungorum accepts 24 species of Epithele:

Epithele bambusae (Burt) K.K.Nakasone (2013)
Epithele bambusina Rick (1959) – Brazil
Epithele belizensis K.K.Nakasone (2013)
Epithele bisterigmata Boidin, Gilles & Duhem (2000) – Réunion
Epithele ceracea K.K.Nakasone (2013)
Epithele citrispora Boidin, Lanq. & Gilles (1983)
Epithele cylindricosterigmata Han C.Wang & Sheng H.Wu (2010)
Epithele efibulata Boidin, Lanq. & Gilles (1983)
Epithele fasciculata (G.Cunn.) Boidin & Gilles (1986)
Epithele horridula Rick (1940)
Epithele hydnoides Burt (1923) – Hawaii
Epithele interrupta Bres. (1914) – Congo
Epithele lutea Han C.Wang & Sheng H.Wu (2010)
Epithele macarangae Boidin & Lanq. (1983)
Epithele malaiensis Boidin & Lanq. (1983)
Epithele nikau G.Cunn. (1956) – New Zealand
Epithele nivea Rick (1959) – Brazil
Epithele ovalispora Boidin & Lanq. (1983)
Epithele reunionis Nakasone (2013)
Epithele ryvardenii Nakasone (2013)
Epithele straminea Rick (1959) – Brazil
Epithele subfusispora (Burds. & Nakasone) Hjortstam & Ryvarden (2005) – South America
Epithele sulphurea Burt (1920) – North America
Epithele typhae (Pers.) Pat. (1900)

References

Taxa described in 1899
Polyporaceae
Polyporales genera
Taxa named by Narcisse Théophile Patouillard